Microsoft Pinball Arcade is a pinball video game from Microsoft. It was released on December 15, 1998 for Microsoft Windows and in 2001 for the Game Boy Color. The game is a collection of seven real pinball tables licensed by Gottlieb. These include: Baffle Ball (1931), Humpty Dumpty (1947), Knock Out (1950), Slick Chick (1963), Spirit of 76 (1975), Haunted House (1982), and Cue Ball Wizard (1992).

The Game Boy Color version features scaled-down graphics, due to hardware limitations. It also excludes the Humpty Dumpty and Cue Ball Wizard tables. A free trial version of the computer game is also available, with Haunted House as the only playable table up to a limited point on the score. This game was designed for Windows 9x and Windows NT 4.0 but it can also natively run on Windows Vista, Windows 7 and Windows 10 without the need to apply compatibility mode. It included an AVI introduction video clip and a few WAV files for special added sound affects, such as Human talking voice and a Moose call.

Reception
GameSpot gave it a 6.2. The game was praised for its faithful reproduction of the sound effects, detailed high-quality graphics, and realistic ball physics.
IGN gave it a 5.2.

See also
 Full Tilt! Pinball (Space Cadet is included with several Windows releases)
 The Pinball Arcade
 Visual Pinball

References

External links
 
 

1998 video games
Windows games
Microsoft games
Pinball video games
Game Boy Color games
Video games developed in the United States
Gottlieb games